Patrick Rafter was the defending champion and won the title defeating Nicolas Escudé 6–1, 6–3 in the final to win his third consecutive Heineken Trophy.

Seeds

Draw

Finals

Top half

Bottom half

References

 Main Draw
 

Rosmalen Grass Court Championships
2000 ATP Tour